Demetrius, son of Althaemenes was hipparch  of one ile of Hetairoi in the battle of Gaugamela. Demetrius' last recorded command was in the Mallian campaign (325 BC).

References
Who's Who in the Age of Alexander the Great by  Waldemar Heckel 

Ancient Macedonian generals
Hetairoi